"Escape Artists Never Die" is the third and last single from Funeral for a Friend's Casually Dressed & Deep in Conversation album. This single marked the first use of the DVD format for the band's singles; second being for the very-sought-after "Monsters" DVD single. It charted at the 19th position on the UK Singles Chart, just like their previous release, "Juneau". The song was originally included on the band's second EP, Four Ways to Scream Your Name and was remixed for the album before being released as a single.

The two B-Sides "You Want Romance?" and "10 Scene Points To The Winner" were brand new recordings at the time, and are noted for being some of the heaviest songs the band ever recorded.

Release
The single's B-side "You Want Romance" was first released as a download-only single on 15 January 2004, along with its music video. The single's cover art was originally used on the download single and refers to "You Want Romance's" opening lines of "The water's colder at the edge".

The "Escape Artists Never Die" single  was released on 2 February 2004, on CD, DVD and 7" Vinyl.

Music video

The music video shows two dancers dancing in front of the band performing in a big room. The male dancer is Craig Scott, a dancer and Musical Theatre performer, currently in the West End production of Joseph and the Amazing Technicolour Dreamcoat.

Track listing

Digital release
You Want Romance?
You Want Romance? (Music Video)

CD
Escape Artists Never Die (Short Version)
You Want Romance?
10 Scene Points To The Winner
You Want Romance? (Music Video)
Escape Artists Never Die (Music Video)

DVD
Escape Artists Never Die
Escape Artists Never Die (Music Video)
Moments Forever Faded (Live Video)
Rookie Of The Year (Live Video Clip)

7" Vinyl
Escape Artists Never Die
You Want Romance?

Notes

2004 singles
Funeral for a Friend songs
Wikipedia requested audio of songs
2003 songs